Customization may refer to:

Customization (anthropology), the process of cultural appropriation and creation of bespoke design
Customization (international marketing), a country-tailored product strategy
Mass customization, the use of computer-aided manufacturing systems to produce custom output
Modding, a slang expression for modification of hardware, software, or other items
Car tuning, the modification of an automobile, motor bike, scooter or moped
Personalization, the use of technology to accommodate differences between individuals
Custom-fit, a design term for personalization with geometric characteristics
Bespoke, made to order. UK equivalent of US custom-made
Custom software, software that is specially developed for some specific organization or other user.

See also
Custom (disambiguation)
Kustom (disambiguation)